Silobia is a genus of lichenized fungi in the family Acarosporaceae. The genus was circumscribed in 2010.

References

External links

Acarosporales
Lecanoromycetes genera